Dongchuan Road is a station on Line 5 of the Shanghai Metro. It serves as an interchange station between the main and branch lines of Line 5, with the opening of the southern extension of Line 5.

The Minhang Campus of Shanghai Jiao Tong University and the Minhang campus of East China Normal University are five minutes' walk away (there used to be a shuttle bus available for students and staff Monday-Friday during daylight hours, but this has stopped with the opening of a public bus line which serves an equivalent route), which makes this station popular with students at the university.

Station layout

References

Railway stations in Shanghai
Line 5, Shanghai Metro
Shanghai Metro stations in Minhang District
Railway stations in China opened in 2003